The spotted turbot (Pleuronichthys ritteri) is a species of flatfish in the family Pleuronectidae. Its native habitat is the subtropical waters of the eastern Pacific, from Morro Bay in California to southern Baja California in Mexico.

References

spotted turbot
Fauna of the Baja California Peninsula
Fish of the Gulf of California
spotted turbot